David Paice (born 24 November 1983) is an English qualified rugby union footballer who plays at hooker for London Irish and has International honours for England.

Paice participated in the 2007 Churchill Cup.

He was later called into the England Saxons side that defeated Ireland A on 1 February 2008.

He made his Senior debut for England during their 2008 Summer Tour, in a defeat to New Zealand at Eden Park. In November 2012 was called up to the England squad and played in all 4 matches in the Autumn Internationals.

Paice led Irish to promotion back to the Aviva Premiership during the 2016/17 Championship winning season, a pivotal role as a fleet footed Hooker. Paice made his 250th appearance for Irish that season and often captained the club on the field.

References

External links
London Irish profile
England profile

1983 births
Living people
England international rugby union players
English rugby union players
London Irish players
People educated at Brisbane State High School
Rugby union hookers
Rugby union players from Darwin, Northern Territory